Pierino is an Italian given name. Notable people with the name include:

 Pierino Albini (1885–1955), Italian racing cyclist
 Pierino Baffi (1930–1985), Italian professional road bicycle racer
 Pierino Belli (1502–1575), Italian soldier and jurist
 Pierino Favalli (1914–1986), Italian road cyclist
 Pierino Ferioli (1904–1985), Italian racing cyclist
 Pierino Gaspard (born 1954), Italian wheelchair curler and alpine skier
 Pierino Prati (1946–2020), Italian footballer
 Pierino da Vinci (c. 1529–1553/54), Italian sculptor

See also 

 Piero
 Pierino (disambiguation)

Italian masculine given names